Chinsali is a town in Zambia, which is both the district headquarters of Chinsali District and provincial headquarters of Muchinga Province.

Location

The geographical coordinates of Chinsali Town are 10°33'08.0"S, 32°04'09.0"E (Latitude:-10.552222; Longitude:32.069167).

Population
The 1990 national population census enumerated 7,509 people in Chinsali. In 2000, the population census that year put the town's population at 11,507. In 2010, that year's population census gave the population total as 15,198. Central Statistical Office Zambia, calculated that the population of Chinsali Town increased at an average rate of 2.82 percent annually, between 2000 and 2010.

Overview
Chinsali is home mainly to the Bemba people, and to their Senior Chief Nkula who is eligible to ascend to the throne of Paramount Chief of the Bemba People based in Mungwi District of Northern Province.

Chinsali's notable people
Notable people originating from Chinsali include: 
 Simon Mwansa Kapwepwe (1922 - 1980), politician, anti-colonialist, author and Zambia's second vice-president (1967 - 1970).
 Kenneth Kaunda, Zambia's first president. Kaunda (1924 - 2021), born at Lubwa Mission, southwest of Chinsali.
 Alice Lenshina (1920 – 1978), founder and leader the Lumpa Church, a controversial sect embracing a mixture of Christian and animist beliefs.

References

External links
 Terracarta/International Travel Maps, Vancouver Canada: "Zambia, 2nd edition", 2000

Populated places in Muchinga Province
Chinsali
Provincial capitals in Zambia